Baïla Diallo (born 24 June 2001) is a professional footballer who plays as a left-back for Clermont in the French Ligue 1. Born in France, he is a youth international for Senegal.

Professional career
Diallo is a youth product of Toulouse and Colomiers, before moving to the youth academy of Clermont in 2018. He began his senior career with their reserves in 2019. On 20 January 2021, he made his professional debut with the senior Clermont side in a 1–1 Coupe de France tie with Grenoble. A couple days later on 22 January 2021, Diallo signed his first professional contract with Clermont, keeping him at the club until June 2024. He spent the 2021-22 season on loan with Orléans in the Championnat National, where he played 31 games, assisted three times and scored one goal in all competitions before returning to Clermont.

International career
Born in France, Diallo is of Senegalese and Guinean descent. He was called up to represent the Senegal U23s for a set of 2023 Africa U-23 Cup of Nations qualification matches in September 2022.

References

External links
 
 

2001 births
Living people
Footballers from Toulouse
Senegalese footballers
Senegal youth international footballers
French footballers
Senegalese people of Guinean descent
French sportspeople of Senegalese descent
French sportspeople of Guinean descent
Association football fullbacks
Clermont Foot players
US Orléans players
Ligue 1 players
Championnat National players
Championnat National 3 players